Østby Church is a parish church of the Church of Norway in Trysil Municipality in Innlandet county, Norway. It is the church for the Østby parish which is part of the Sør-Østerdal prosti (deanery) in the Diocese of Hamar. The white, wooden church was built in a long church design in 1940 using plans drawn up by the Norwegian Directorate of Public Construction and Property. The church seats about 100 people.

History
The church was originally built as an annex chapel. The Norwegian Directorate of Public Construction and Property designed the building. Later, the chapel was upgraded to the status of parish church and it was renamed as a church.

Media gallery

See also
List of churches in Hamar

References

Trysil
Churches in Innlandet
Long churches in Norway
Wooden churches in Norway
20th-century Church of Norway church buildings
Churches completed in 1940
1940 establishments in Norway